UX Arietis is a triple star system located in the northern zodiacal constellation of Aries. Based upon parallax measurements from the Gaia satellite, it is roughly 165 light years away. The primary, component Aa, is a variable star of the RS CVn type. The variability of the star is believed due to a combination of cool star spots and warm flares, set against the baseline quiescent temperature of the stellar atmosphere. The variability appears to be cyclical with a period of 8−9 years. The star varies in brightness from magnitude 6.35 to 6.71, meaning it may be intermittently visible to the unaided eye under ideal dark-sky conditions.

A more distant companion, component C, shares a common proper motion and is at the same distance.  It is another cool dwarf star with an estimated spectral class of K2.  Any orbit is estimated to require over 100,000 years.

References

Further reading

External links
 HIP 16042
 Image HD 21242
 HIP 16042

Aries (constellation)
G-type subgiants
Triple stars
021242
Spectroscopic binaries
016042
RS Canum Venaticorum variables
Arietis, UX
Durchmusterung objects
TIC objects